WarioWare Gold is a minigame compilation co-developed by Nintendo EPD and Intelligent Systems and published by Nintendo for the Nintendo 3DS family of video game consoles. The ninth installment in the WarioWare series, it was released in PAL regions in July 2018, and in North America and Japan the following month. The game's plot follows the greedy Wario who has organized a gaming tournament for a large cash prize, with the ultimate goal of claiming the money for himself. Meanwhile, various other WarioWare characters deal with other problems which play out in the form of short stories.

Similar to previous entries, in WarioWare Gold, the player is tasked with completing consecutive "microgames" at increasing paces. Gold features both microgames from past entries in the series and some new ones for a total of over 300 microgames, the most featured in the series to date. After completing the story mode, additional modes such as the challenge mode are unlocked. The game's creative director, Goro Abe, put careful planning in determining which 300 of the 1,100 microgames across the series would be featured. Gold also featured voice acting, a first for the series. Intelligent Systems focused less on collectible items and more on core programming after deeming them not as important. 

Gold received generally positive reviews, being praised for its graphics, additional modes, and the introduction of voice acting in multiple languages. Reception of its various collectibles was split, with some finding them worthwhile while others on the contrary. The game sold poorly at first but later spiked in 2020 in the United Kingdom. A follow-up for the Nintendo Switch, WarioWare: Get It Together!, released in 2021.

Gameplay 

As is tradition for a WarioWare game, the player is tasked with completing "microgames"—various minigames with very short time limits—in rapid succession. When one is complete, a point is given, and the game moves on to the next. If a microgame is completed incorrectly, or the time runs out, the player loses one of four lives. If they run out of lives, the game ends and the high score is displayed, which is determined by how many microgames were passed. When a section of microgames is completed, the player will complete a boss microgame. After which, the minigames can be replayed and will begin to speed up the time allotted. 

As a collection game, most microgames that appear have once existed in a previous title in the WarioWare series. These include the Game Boy Advance original, Twisted!, Touched!, Smooth Moves, D.I.Y., and Game & Wario, in addition to some new ones for a total of over 300 microgames. The microgames vary in how they are completed. They involve pressing buttons, tilting the system, touching the touch screen, and blowing on the system's microphone. 

Gold features full voice acting in the story mode, a first for the series, with an additional unlockable feature allowing players to redub their own voice over the game's cutscenes. Alongside the story mode, there are missions for the player to complete that awards them with coins that can be used to purchase rewards such as additional minigames. The challenge mode is one of the multiple modes unlocked after completing the story mode. In the challenge mode, the microgames are reintroduced alongside various distractions and complications to the original format. For example, sometimes the screen will be covered in ink or other objects to obscure vision. There's also a local multiplayer mode where players compete in an endurance competition of who can complete the most minigames in succession.

Plot 
Having run out of money following a treasure hunt in the village of Luxeville, the greedy Wario decides to organize a Nintendo 3DS gaming tournament in Diamond City, convincing his friends to design some new Mash League, Twist League, Touch League, & Ultra League (that also include blowing games & short pop-up games) games based on the Sports, That's Life, Fantasy, & Nintendo Classics themes, for the event, promising them payment. For an entry fee of ten thousand coins, he offers a ten million coin prize to the tournament's winner, although he secretly plots to take all the prize money for himself. While the player competes in the tournament, a girl from Luxeville named Lulu who has tracked Wario down calls him out and begins training to challenge him, seeking to retrieve the town's prized treasure (a large golden pot) that Wario had stolen from her village. 

The rest of the game consists of self-contained vignettes for all of Wario's friends; these range from Jimmy T trying to impress two girls at Sapphire Street, Mona going to Joe's Clothes trying to find a dress to wear for her party, Dribble and Spitz fighting off UFOs with their space-faring taxi, 5-Volt doing a workout to become fit, Ashley and Red fighting a demon known as Hungraa, Dr. Crygor and Mike coming across one of Crygor's old inventions, Doris-1, in the spooky Agate Forest, 18-Volt engaging in a rap battle with newcomer 13-Amp to win back a stolen game console at Emerald Street, Penny trying to cure Dr. Crygor after her elixir to help make her a mega pop star gives Dr. Crygor a stomachache, Kat and Ana mistaking Mrs. Munches, a gourmet master, as their ninja trainer while trying to get ninja learners permits at Diamond City Castle, Fronk helping 9-Volt realize that math's fun, Young Cricket and Master Mantis training at an amusement park, Orbulon trying to acquire pigs in order to complete his order at a fast food restaurant called Gigantaburger, the hosts of the Sports and That's Life themes, along with Mike and Front, partying at Club Joe, and the hosts of the Fantasy and Nintendo Classics themes, also with Mike and Fronk, having a potluck at Peridot Campgrounds.

In the game's final level, Wario refuses to give the player the prize money, as he already declared himself as the winner of the tournament. Putting the pot of Luxeville on top of his head, the pot grants him superpowers and turns him into the extra-evil, extra-powerful, and extra-unstoppable supervillain version of him called "Wario Deluxe". With Lulu's help, the player manages to beat Wario Deluxe and win the tournament, She then knocks the pot off Wario's head with a water gun and changes him back to normal. Returning the pot to Lulu after she reveals that it is actually Luxeville's public toilet, Wario attempts to flee with the money he made from the tournament when he is intercepted by his friends. Taking the small amount of money (Wario spent most of the money for his hot air balloons) that Wario refused to pay them for their work and splitting it evenly, the player receives their entry fee back and the group even decides to share some of the money with Wario as well in an act of generosity, though Wario still claims that all the money is his and still moans about his loss. Meanwhile, Lulu returns to Luxeville with the pot, only to learn that the townspeople had bought a new high-tech toilet in her absence.

Development 

WarioWare Gold was developed for the Nintendo 3DS by Nintendo EPD and Intelligent Systems, the co-developers behind most previous WarioWare titles, and published by Nintendo. According to Goro Abe, the game's creative director, despite most microgames appearing in prior titles in the series, many of them were reworked from scratch. Since Gold consists of over 300 microgames with the series totaling over 1,100, Abe surveyed opinions from the staff of Intelligent Systems on which microgames the series should include. After he determined the results, he ranked the microgames based on the top picks from the staff, as well as which ones had easy-to-understand rules and games that have not aged well. One of the new gameplay additions was the split-screen challenge mode; this involved the use of the dual screens of the Nintendo 3DS where after one microgame was completed, it would immediately switch over to the other screen. This was a concept the team had wanted to implement since the Nintendo DS, but the idea proved too taxing on the hardware at the time.

Full voice acting was included for the first time in the series, as the development team felt that it would lead to a deeper connection between the player and the game. They also believe the change made the characters feel more alive, although Abe stated future games would not necessarily have full voice acting. Wario for instance was voiced by longtime actor Charles Martinet in English-speaking countries. While the game was released after the launch of the Nintendo Switch, Abe ruled out porting WarioWare Gold to the platform, stating it would "come with a number of issues" and that it would be difficult to reproduce "the same sense of fun".

Speaking about the unlockable souvenirs, Abe explained that while Twisted! and Touched! featured a large number of collectibles centered around the gyro and touchscreen as both technologies were still fairly novel at the time, the team felt such unlockables were unnecessary for Gold due to how commonplace both forms of inputs had become. He also explained that with the given time constraints, they preferred to focus on extras that did not require as much programming effort, like the Records. In a 2018 interview with Game Informer, Abe explained that the future of the WarioWare series would be placed on the reception of Gold.

WarioWare Gold was announced during a Nintendo Direct broadcast on March 8, 2018. The game released in Europe on July 27, 2018, North America on August 3, 2018, and Japan a day prior. Shortly before release on June 5, a free demo of the game was available on the Nintendo 3DS eShop.

Reception 

WarioWare Gold received "generally favorable reviews" according to review aggregator Metacritic, receiving a 78/100 based on 45 critic reviews.

Despite being a collection of microgames across the series, critics such as Nintendo Life and IGN appreciated the additional work done by Intelligent Systems. In addition, they found the old microgames to be reworked so well they often could not tell the new and the old apart from each other. Nintendo Lifes Steve Bowling mentioning how  "say[ing] that WarioWare Gold is a mere 'best of' collection would be unfair". Most lauded the introduction of voice acting, with Christian Donlan of Eurogamer joking how the addition, alongside a new graphics style "could, conceivably, be the only thing that's been missing from your life until now." James O'Connor, writing for GameSpot, admired Charles Martinet's impression of Wario; he wrote how he "imbues Wario with a sense of pride and malice here that's a delight to witness."

Some saw the addition of microgames being organized into categories to be a helpful addition, which helped with not having to constantly switch between control schemes such as tapping and button pressing. Nintendo Life found the concept to be helpful when playing in areas where they were constricted in space or the use of the microphone.

Reviewers praised the challenge mode and the unique twists they made on the microgames after completing the main storyline. O'Connor found the concepts to be "tense and exciting", and Bowling saw the experience as "fast, fun and chaotic in the best way". Tristan Ogilvie of IGN, however, sometimes considered hindrances to be rather annoying instead of challenging or unique.

Collectibles received mixed reception; Game Informers Kyle Hilliard enjoyed the system and called them "worthwhile pursuits", and while he did find some to be more entertaining than others, he praised the system for being unique. Donlan called the collection aspect a fun system to participate in after completing the story mode. Reviewers at Famitsu saw collectibles as neat additions after completing the short story mode. Kotaku found the collectibles to be of varying quality, ranging from fun time-wasters to barely interesting at all. Similarly, IGN and ArsTechnica believed the collectibles were, for the most part, not worth having to constantly replay old microgames.

Sales 
WarioWare Gold released on August 3, 2018, leaving only two days for it to top the NPD sales charts. The game didn't make the top 20 list and only reached third on their Nintendo 3DS charts, behind Pokémon Ultra Sun and Ultra Moon. According to Jeff Grubb of VentureBeat, reaching the top spot in two days would have been possible for a new game; he attributed the lack of sales due to the release of Nintendo's new home console, the Nintendo Switch. In Japan, Gold sold 30,000 copies at launch and had reached 93,000 physical copies sold by its last week on the Media Create sales charts. In sales charts in the UK later on in January 2020, the game began to slowly drop down and stayed in the 827th position. However, the game peaked at fifth place, about 2 years after release.

Notes

References 

Attribution

External links

2018 video games
Nintendo 3DS games
Nintendo 3DS-only games
Nintendo Entertainment Planning & Development games
Video games about video games
Video games developed in Japan
Video games that use Amiibo figurines
WarioWare
Multiplayer and single-player video games
Party video games
Intelligent Systems games
Video games produced by Kensuke Tanabe